Daniel Joubert van der Merwe (born  in Frankfort, South Africa) is a South African rugby union player who last played for the . His regular position is prop.

Career

Youth

Golden Lions

He represented the s in the 2008 Under-19 Provincial Championship and the s in the Under-21 Provincial Championships in 2009 and 2010.

In 2010, he was also included in the Golden Lions' squad for the 2010 Vodacom Cup.

CUT Ixias and Griffons

Van der Merwe moved back to the Free State in 2011 to enroll at the Central University of Technology in Bloemfontein. CUT eventually won the competition, beating  25–18 in the final. However, they failed to win promotion to the 2012 Varsity Cup competition, losing 43–50 to  after extra time in the promotion play-off match.

He made nine appearances for CUT in the 2012 Varsity Shield competition – scoring tries against  and  during the regular season as CUT once again finished top of the log. However, despite Van der Merwe scoring his third try of the campaign in the final against , they lost the match 17–19 to remain in the Varsity Shield competition for another two years.

Van der Merwe's performances didn't go unnoticed and he was included in the  squad for the 2012 Vodacom Cup at the conclusion of the Varsity Shield.

He was once again a key player for the  during the 2013 Varsity Shield, playing in all nine of their matches during the competition as they won the competition for the second time in three seasons. He also scored one try against . He established himself as the Griffons first-choice tighthead prop during the 2013 Currie Cup First Division, starting ten matches and coming on as a replacement in a further two matches. The Griffons finished in sixth place, missing out on a semi-final berth.

A dominant 2014 Varsity Shield season with  followed, as the side won all nine matches during the competition. Van der Merwe had a very productive season, scoring five tries in his side's run to help them earn promotion to the 2015 Varsity Cup. Two starts for the Griffons followed in the 2014 Vodacom Cup and he then started in all six of their matches during the 2014 Currie Cup qualification tournament as they finished in third position to qualify to the 2014 Currie Cup First Division. Van der Merwe also scored his first try in the Currie Cup competition in a 24–43 defeat to eventual winners . He made three appearances in the regular season of the First Division to help the Griffons finish in second spot in the competition.

References

1989 births
Living people
People from Mafube Local Municipality
White South African people
South African rugby union players
Rugby union props
Golden Lions players
Griffons (rugby union) players
Rugby union players from the Free State (province)